Carlos Henrique Barbosa Augusto, also known as Henrique (born May 29, 1989 in São Paulo), is a Brazilian footballer who plays as a defensive midfielder. He played in Série B for Campinense.

Career
Henry began his career at São Caetano. He was loaned to Taubaté, Ulbra (now University) and Campinense. In 2010, he moved to the Guild. On January 4 this year, was officially unveiled by the club gaucho, as new hire. The first wheel has signed a contract lasting one year on loan at São Caetano.

Career statistics
(Correct )

Contract
 Grêmio.

References

External links
 Grêmio
 ogol.com

1989 births
Living people
Brazilian footballers
Grêmio Barueri Futebol players
Association football midfielders
Footballers from São Paulo